New Lancaster may refer to:

New Lancaster, Indiana
New Lancaster, Kansas